Patrick Outman (born  1992) is an American politician from Michigan. A member of the Republican, he is a member of the Michigan House of Representatives from the 70th district. Elected in 2020, he assumed office on January 1, 2021.

Early life, education, and career
Pat Outman was born around 1992 in Six Lakes, Michigan to father Rick Outman. In 2010, Pat graduated from Lakeview High School. Pat later earned a degree in business administration and legal studies from Ferris State University, where he graduated with honors. Outman worked for his family's excavating business and cattle farm.

Political career
Before being elected to the Michigan House of Representatives, Outman was a staffer in the state legislature. He was elected to the state House as a Republican from 70th district in November 2020. He took office in January 2021. He replaced outgoing state Representative Jim Lower, and fills the seat formerly occupied by his father. The district covers all of Montcalm County and parts of Gratiot County.

In February 2021, Outman introduced a bill seeks to allow winners of multi-state lotteries to collect their winnings while staying anonymous.

In 2021, Outman was one of four representatives (all Republicans) to vote against HB 4856, which would allow government agencies to exempt from disclosure under the state Freedom of Information the names of victims of sexual misconduct who sue as anonymous plaintiffs. The legislation was one piece of a bipartisan package brought after the Larry Nasser scandal.

In 2022, Outman sponsored a nonbinding resolution, HB 210, that accused Michigan public schools of harboring "radical politics" and engaging in "political indoctrination." He offered no evidence for these claims. The resolution also criticized Democratic Governor Gretchen Whitmer for vetoing a bill to create a school voucher-type program for private school tuition. The resolution was approved by the state House Education Committee on a party-line vote.

Personal life
Outman is a member of the National Rifle Association.

References

Living people
1990s births
Ferris State University alumni
Republican Party members of the Michigan House of Representatives
People from Montcalm County, Michigan
21st-century American politicians